Charles Wyndham (1796 – 16 February 1866), was an English politician.  He was Member of Parliament (MP) for West Sussex from 1841 to 1847.

Wyndham was the fifth son of George Wyndham, 3rd Earl of Egremont (1751–1837) and his mistress Elizabeth Ilive (died 1822), of Petworth House, near Chichester, West Sussex, and a descendant of John Wyndham who played an important role in the establishment of defence organisation in the West Country against the threat of Spanish invasion.

References

External links 
 

1796 births
1866 deaths
Members of the Parliament of the United Kingdom for English constituencies
UK MPs 1841–1847